Peter Hanlon is an Australian sports writer. Deputy sports editor of The Age, for whom he has written since 1995, he has also written for The Guardian, The Sun, The Times, Sunday Times, Daily Express and Today. With a focus largely on cricket, he has won "multiple" media awards in Victoria, including Cricket Victoria's leading media award for his 2009 Why Cricket, the "most outstanding written, photographic, radio or television work relating to Victorian cricket".

He has recently created controversy due to an article he wrote about Irish female boxer Katie Taylor which contained several offensive remarks about the Irish.  The Irish ambassador to New Zealand and Australia, Noel White, expressed his disappointment and the article was revoked and heavily edited before being reissued.

Notes

Australian journalists
Cricket historians and writers
People from Gympie
Living people
Place of birth missing (living people)
Year of birth missing (living people)